Lieutenant General Colm Mangan was Chief of Staff of the Defence Forces from September 2000 until February 2004.

Mangan joined the Defence Forces as a cadet in 1960 and is cited as having "overseen major strategic initiatives in the key areas of state defence, provision of peace support and government support services, equipment and infrastructual modernisations programmes and human resource management."

He oversaw the deployment of Irish troops to East Timor (1999–2002), Kosovo (1999-), Eritrea 2001-2003 and Liberia (2003-). He was awarded the Legion of Merit by the United States in September 2003, and the Cross of Honor in Gold by Germany in January 2004. In recognition of his service to the Defence Forces and the nation, the Irish government awarded him the Distinguished Service Medal (with honour) on Thursday 19 February 2004. He was succeeded by Lt. General James Sreenan in February 2004.

See also
Irish Defence Forces

References

Living people
Year of birth missing (living people)
Irish Army generals
Recipients of the Distinguished Service Medal (Ireland)
Foreign recipients of the Legion of Merit
People educated at Rockwell College
Chiefs of Staff of the Defence Forces (Ireland)
Irish military personnel